Organised by the International Quizzing Association and held from 11 to 14 November 2021, the 2021 Quiz Olympiad in Kraków was the second Quiz Olympiad. The event was planned to take place from 5 November 2020 until 8 November 2020, but was postponed a year due to the COVID-19 pandemic.

Event 
The event hosted quizzes that combined awarded 132 medals

Quizzes
The following were the official quizzes at the 2021 Quiz Olympiad:

Individual Quiz
Nations Team Quiz
Pairs Quiz
History Quiz
Sport Quiz
Literature Quiz
Business Quiz
Sciences Quiz
Digital Quiz
Visual Arts Quiz
Television Quiz
Geography Quiz
Film Quiz
Performing Arts Quiz
Pop Music Quiz
Pentathlon Specialist Quiz
National Specialist Quiz
High Brow Specialist Quiz
Populist Special Quiz
Speed Quiz
Knockout Quiz
Under 30 Individual Quiz
Under 30 National Team Quiz
Under 30 Pairs Quiz

Some quizzes have similar standing with IOC demonstration sports. These were awarded medals, but do not feature on the overall medals table:

Aspirational Team Quiz
Frankenquiz
World Club Team Quiz

Participants 
There will be 182 participants from 24 nations at the 2021 Quiz Olympiad. Some notable participants include Nico Pattyn, Ronny Swiggers, and Tom Trogh of Belgium; Dorjana Širola of Croatia; Ian Bayley of England; Tero Kalliolevo of Finland; Sebastian Klussmann of Germany; Barry Simmons of Scotland; and Shane Whitlock of the United States.

Medalists 
The results were:

Medal table 
The total medal table was:

References

External links 
 Official website
 International Quizzing Association

Quiz games
Student quiz competitions
Trivia competitions
Quiz Olympiad